Redditch is a town, and local government district, approximately 15 miles (24km) south of Birmingham city centre. Located in north-east Worcestershire, England, The district had a population of 87,036 in 2021. In the 19th century, it became the international centre for the needle and fishing tackle industry. At one point, 90% of the world's needles were manufactured in the town and its neighbourhoods.
In the 1960s, it became a model for modern new town planning as the town itself was set as a commuter town for the city of Birmingham.

History

The first recorded mention of Redditch (Red-Ditch, thought to be a reference to the red clay of the nearby River Arrow) is in 1348, the year of the outbreak of the Black Death. During the Middle Ages, it became a centre of needle-making and later prominent industries were fish-hooks, fishing tackle, motorcycles and springs, the last of which was notably undertaken by Herbert Terry and Sons. Redditch was designated a new town on 10 April 1964, and the population increased dramatically from 32,000 to around 77,000. Housing developments such as Church Hill, Matchborough, Winyates, Lodge Park, and Woodrow were created to accommodate a large overspill from the industrially expanding Birmingham. Redditch was built as a "flagship" town using new methods and new town planning: all the main roads (mostly new dual carriageways as well as a ring road for the town centre) were banked to reduce noise to the new housing estates, and the whole of Redditch was landscaped.

By the 21st century, needle-making and other traditional industries had been replaced by modern light industry and services, with Redditch also functioning as a dormitory town for Birmingham. The automotive retailer Halfords and engineering company GKN both have their headquarters in Redditch. Manufacturer of precious metal contacts, Samuel Taylor Ltd, has manufacturing plants within the town. Following the redevelopment of the flagship Kingfisher Shopping Centre in 2002, Redditch is undergoing an economic and cultural renaissance.

The town is home to several historical sites. The National Needle Museum and the ruins of Bordesley Abbey are located in the Abbey Ward district, and the remains of a medieval moated settlement called Moons Moat are within the Church Hill estate.

Governance
The parliamentary constituency of Redditch is represented by Rachel Maclean of the Conservatives, elected in the 2017 General Election.

Redditch has a Borough Council with councillors elected from the Wards of Redditch, which manages lower-tier local government services. Worcestershire County Council manages upper-tier services.

The foundation stone for Redditch Town Hall was laid in 1981. It cost £7.5 million to build and it was opened in 1982.

Geography
Redditch is in Worcestershire, just south of the West Midlands urban area. The main access routes are the A441 via junction 2 of the M42 Motorway, the A435 from junction 3 of the M42 and the A448 via junctions 4 or 5 of the M5. The Roman Road known as Icknield Street is prominent, running north to south through the eastern side of the town.

Districts of Redditch
The Borough of Redditch is divided into several districts. To the east of the town are "New Town Districts" built in the 1970s and 1980s. To the west of the Borough are older "Former Village Districts" that dominate the south and west.

See: Districts of Redditch

Since 2011, Redditch has participated in the Greater Birmingham & Solihull Local Enterprise Partnership along with neighbouring authorities Birmingham, Bromsgrove, Cannock Chase, East Staffordshire, Lichfield, Solihull, Tamworth, and Wyre Forest.

Green belt

Redditch is within a green belt region that extends into the wider surrounding counties, and is in place to reduce urban sprawl, prevent the towns in the nearby West Midlands conurbations centred around Birmingham and Coventry, discouraging further convergence, protect the identity of outlying communities, encourage brownfield reuse, and preserve nearby countryside. This is achieved by restricting inappropriate development within the designated areas, and imposing stricter conditions on permitted building.

The main urban area up to the Webheath, Walkwood, and Hunt End suburbs, Astwood Bank, and the southernmost extent of the borough are exempt from the green belt area, bar small adjacent green belt 'wedges', but surrounding smaller villages, hamlets, and rural areas such as Feckenham, Littleworth, Old Yarr, and Ham Green up to the B4090 Salt Way road are 'washed over' by the designation.

Transport
The M42 motorway is a short drive away and it is linked by dual carriageways and A-class roads to surrounding towns such as Bromsgrove and Evesham. There are regular bus services to Studley, Bromsgrove, Catshill, and Birmingham.

Railway
The Redditch railway station is a southern terminus of the Cross-City Line and provides a regular train service via Birmingham New Street to Four Oaks and Lichfield. Redditch railway station was first opened as the terminus of the Redditch Railway on 19 September 1859, alongside what is now Clive Road. This first station stayed until 4 May 1868 when the last section from Alcester to Redditch of the Redditch and Evesham Railway was closed, at which point a second station was built alongside the junction of Bromsgrove Road and Plymouth Road. This station was provided with a standard Midland Railway design and two platforms. The current station was built in 1993.

Buses

There is an extensive network of local bus services run by Diamond West Midlands and other operators (including Stagecoach and a community run bus). Many services run from the bus station in the town centre, a postcard of which was voted Britain's most boring postcard in a competition run by the photographer Martin Parr. The bus station was rebuilt as part of the 2002 shopping centre expansion.

Some areas of Redditch have dedicated bus routes; however, there have been issues with safety on these routes and 3 children have died over the past 15 years.

Road system
Redditch is occasionally noted for its confusing road system dominated by a system of dual carriageways built when it became a New Town, including the only cloverleaf interchange in England at the junction of the A441 and the Bromsgrove-bound A448. The system is designed to allow rapid flow of large volumes of traffic around the various districts and into the town centre, whilst keeping fast moving vehicles separated from residential streets. Redditch was briefly famous (via The Graham Norton Show) for a tongue-in-cheek calendar featuring its "picturesque" roundabouts created by a local printing company. The calendar was called, unsurprisingly, 'Roundabouts of Redditch' and it proved so successful that it sparked a national series. This self-similar pattern is found on a smaller scale in many of the modern estates in the town, which follow a Radburn style of planned community.

Education

Redditch is one of the few areas of the country where the three-tier system of first, middle, and high schools still exists. Students attend first school from the age of 4, middle school from the age of 9, and secondary school at the age of 13. Other areas of Worcestershire adopted this system at the same time as Redditch (in the 1970s), but many have reverted to the traditional 5–7 infant, 7–11 junior and 11-16/18 secondary schools.

Redditch currently has four high schools (RSA Academy Arrow Vale, Saint Augustine's Catholic High School, Tudor Grange Academy, Trinity High School) and six middle schools.

Heart of Worcestershire College (often referred to locally as "HOW College") is a large general further education college: one of its four campuses is in central Redditch; the other three are in Bromsgrove, Worcester, and Malvern. The closest university is the University of Birmingham, 12.5 miles (20 km) to the north.

Amenities

Since June 2013, the swimming pool at Abbey Stadium Leisure Centre has been heated using waste heat diverted from Redditch Crematorium. Redditch Borough Council expects the scheme to reduce the leisure centre's gas bill by more than 40%, equivalent to an annual saving of about £15,000.

In popular culture
Malcolm Bradbury's novel The History Man, which was dramatised by the BBC in 1981, contained a reference to Redditch when Flora Beniform, a sociologist, mentioned to the hero Howard Kirk that she was studying an outbreak of troilism in Redditch.
It is also sometimes reported as being mentioned in the John Cooper Clarke song, 'Burnley', however Reddish (a district in Greater Manchester) is the more likely interpretation.

Rik Mayall's Kevin Turvey – The Man Behind The Green Door was set and filmed in Redditch.

The 2012 film Sightseers is partly set in Redditch.

Redditch is featured in a section heading in An Utterly Impartial History of Britain by John O'Farrell.

Birmingham and national TV comedian Jasper Carrott makes Redditch a repeated butt of his jokes, for example over the difficulty of escaping the Redditch ring road.

There is a listed theatre in Redditch called the Palace Theatre.

The BBC Game Show The Wall's 4th series was filmed at Fly By Nite Studios in Lakeside

Places of interest

Bordesley Abbey: remains of a former Cistercian abbey, later used as a Royal Swannery.
Forge Mill Needle Museum: exhibition of traditional needle making.
Redditch Library: A popular public library with around 50,000 books, 40 public computers, free WiFi, and a publicly accessible town archive that goes back to the 1700s. The current building was built in 1976. The demolition of the structurally sound building has been proposed by Redditch Borough Council at the cost of £4.2 million. No plans have been published regarding provisions for relocating the library service.

Kingfisher Shopping Centre

Kingfisher Shopping Centre was opened in 1976 by the then Prime Minister James Callaghan and now forms the town's primary retail centre.

It is one of the largest covered shopping centres in the United Kingdom. In 2007, a cinema opened on the new upper floor and is now owned by Vue Cinemas.

Arrow Valley Country Park

Redditch has  of public open space in Arrow Valley Country Park. This incorporates the  Arrow Valley Lake, fed by the River Arrow. The park incorporates a Local Nature Reserve, Proctor's Barn Meadow.
The Arrow Valley Countryside centre, opened in 2000 in the Country Park, has a lakeside café, gift shop and an interactive exhibition. The lake is also used for water sports. There are four waymarked trails for walking and cycling around the lake and through the Country Park. There is a skate park in the south of the park with walks along the river Arrow through the Country Park to the Forge Mill Museum in the north. There are interactive events and family activities at the Countryside Centre and a comprehensive children's play area.

Royal Enfield motorcycles
Redditch was the home of the Royal Enfield motorcycle. This is where the main factory of the original company was located and the business continued manufacturing until the 1960s, the last model being the Interceptor. The Redditch factory was closed in 1967 and production was moved to the Bradford on Avon factory, which closed in 1970, ending English Enfield manufacturing. In the mid 1950s, the company established a partner, Madras Motors, in Madras, India, who manufactured the Bullet 350 model. The Indian factory is producing new models and has taken Royal Enfield into its third century of manufacturing. Some of the original factory buildings in Redditch still remain, most are in a derelict state and can be seen from Hewell Road. Some buildings have been taken over and now make the old part of Enfield Industrial Estate close to the town centre on Hewell Road.

Notable people
John Bonham (1948–1980), Drummer with Led Zeppelin, was born in Redditch and attended Lodge Farm Secondary Modern School.
Lionel Britton (1887–1971), novelist and writer of science fiction plays was born at Astwood Bank now a suburb of Redditch.
Russell Brookes (born 1945), British rally champion
Nigel Clark from band Dodgy grew up in Redditch and went to The Leys High school, now Tudor Grange Academy Redditch
Charlie Clemmow, soap actress who is best known for her role as Imogen Hollins in the BBC soap, Doctors. She grew up in Astwood Bank.
 Stacy Coldicott (born 1974), footballer, West Bromwich Albion and Grimsby Town F.C. was born in Redditch.
Charles Dance (born 1946), actor, born in Redditch
Jimmy Davis (1982–2003), footballer, Manchester United, Swindon Town, and Watford F.C. Born in Bromsgrove, his funeral took place at Redditch Crematorium.
 Jonathan Dow, actor was born in Redditch.
Ruth England (born 1970), TV presenter, educated in Redditch
Luke Johnson, musician, Lostprophets was born in Redditch.
Antony Johnston, author, was raised in Redditch.
Zoë Lister, actor Hollyoaks trained at the Starlight School of Dance in Winyates, Redditch.
Joe Lolley, footballer, Nottingham Forest, ex-Huddersfield Town and Kidderminster Harriers was born in Redditch.
Tony Martin (born 1957), singer, Black Sabbath frontman 1987–1991, 1994–1997
Tom Paddock (1822–1863) was born in Redditch, and known as the "Redditch Needlepointer", champion heavyweight bare-knuckle boxer of England in 1856
Nathanael Saleh, actor born in Redditch in 2006.
Jacqui Smith, former MP for Redditch and first female British Home Secretary
Freddie Starr (1943–2019) lived in Mappleborough Green, just outside Redditch.
Alan Styler, (1925–1970) D'Oyly Carte Opera Company baritone, 1947–1968 was born and raised in Redditch.
Harry Styles (born 1994) born in Redditch. Raised in Holmes Chapel. Singer, songwriter and actor. Member of boy band One Direction.
John Taylor (born 1960), musician, Duran Duran, went to Abbey High School in Redditch
Raymond Thompson, scriptwriter and TV producer, born in Redditch. Creator of hit New Zealand teen/sci-fi television series The Tribe
Archer Windsor-Clive (1890–1914), cricketer

Town twinning
In 1956, Redditch was twinned with Auxerre in Burgundy, France. This twinning proved sufficiently popular to form an organisation named The Friends of Auxerre (FoA). At the beginning of June each year the coupling of these two towns is officially celebrated.

In 1986, Redditch was twinned with Mtwara in Tanzania. Frequent events are organised with assistance from the community of Tanzanian students at Birmingham University and Selly Oak College.

Auxerre, France
Mtwara, Tanzania

Friendship links
Redditch also has formal "Friendship" links with:
St. Elizabeth, Jamaica, West Indies
Gruchet-le-Valasse, France
Gujar Khan, Pakistan

Sport
Redditch sport teams include:

Redditch United F.C. playing Football in the 
Redditch Borough F.C. playing Football in the 
NEW Ravens playing Rugby league in the Midlands Rugby League Premier Division
Redditch RFC playing Rugby Union in the Midlands 4 West (South)
Redditch CC playing Cricket in the Worcestershire County Cricket League
Redditch Arrows American football Team
Longmeadow Redditch Badminton Club playing Badminton with 8 teams in the Worcestershire and Solihull Leagues.
Redditch Roller Sports Club Roller Derby and Recretational Roller Skating Instruction
Bromsgrove and Redditch Athletic Club
Redditch Rockets Skater Hockey Club
Redditch Swimming Club
The Redditch Road and Path Cycling Club

Climate
Redditch has an oceanic climate (Köppen climate classification Cfb) similar to almost all of the United Kingdom.

See also
Districts of Redditch
Our Lady of Mount Carmel Church, Redditch

References

External links

Website of Redditch
Redditch Local History Group – Local History Group based at Forge Mill Museum

 
Towns in Worcestershire
New towns in England
Non-metropolitan districts of Worcestershire
Radburn design housing estates
New towns started in the 1960s
Populated places established in 1964
Boroughs in England